Ardolino is an Italian surname. It comes probably from Arduino (name). Notable people with this surname include:
 Edward Ardolino (1883-1945), American architectural sculptor
 Emile Ardolino (1943-1993), American film director
 Tom Ardolino (1955-2012), American musician

Italian-language surnames